1700 Naval Air Squadron of the Fleet Air Arm of the Royal Navy was formed in November 1944 at RNAS Lee-on-Solent as an amphibian bomber reconnaissance squadron. It was equipped with the Supermarine Sea Otter, and the squadron joined HMS Khedive in January 1945 bound for Sulur in India.  On arrival the Sea Otters were augmented with Supermarine Walrus amphibian aircraft.

The squadron's aircraft were distributed among the escort carriers of the Far East Fleet for air sea rescue and minesweeping duties.  By April 1945 aircraft of the squadron were serving in HM Ships Stalker, Hunter, Khedive, Emperor, Ameer, Attacker and Shah.  July saw operations at Car Nicobar, and off Phuket Island.

Present day
On 31 October 2017, the Maritime Aviation Support Force (MASF) at RNAS Culdrose was recommissioned as 1700 Naval Air Squadron. The unit provides personnel and naval aviation support to operations for ships and land bases globally.

Aircraft flown
1700 Naval Air Squadron flew 2 different aircraft types:

Supermarine Sea Otter
Supermarine Walrus

References

External links

1700 series Fleet Air Arm squadrons
Military units and formations established in 1945